The IBM 5880, also known as the IBM 5880 Electrocardiograph System, is a computerized electrocardiograph and diagnostic tool. It was developed by IBM scientist Ray Bonner in the early 1970s and announced in 1978.

The IBM 5880 was designed to analyze electrocardiograms, measurements of the electrical activity of the heart, and provide diagnostic advice to the same standards as a cardiologist. Similar programs already ran on mainframe computers, but the 5880 was the first version that could be placed in a cart and taken into hospital conditions.
When it first arrived in the hospitals doctors were afraid that they no longer would be paid to "read" and EKG. Going forward all EKGs done by the 5880 we had in our hospital still had to be "reviewed" by a doctor and was paid for that. Michael Grant Assistant director of respiratory care, Amesbury Hospital, Amesbury Ma 1979 to 1981

References

IBM Archives

Products introduced in 1978
5880